Rudolf Schmid (born 13 July 1945) is a Swiss bobsledder. He competed in the four man event at the 1976 Winter Olympics.

References

1945 births
Living people
Swiss male bobsledders
Olympic bobsledders of Switzerland
Bobsledders at the 1976 Winter Olympics
Place of birth missing (living people)